Julia R. Hurley (May 11, 1848 – June 4, 1927) was an American actress who found popularity in her senior years in silent films. She is best remembered today as the 'landlady with the lamp' in the John Barrymore classic Dr. Jekyll and Mr. Hyde 1920, a role for which she is uncredited. This film is her most readily available film today.

Hurley's film debut occurred in Corporal Truman's War Story when she was 63 years old. She worked for many of the early film studios i.e.: Biograph, Kalem, Essanay, Reliance, Imp, Champion and Solax. On Broadway, she portrayed Mrs. Coberg in Blossom Time.

As with most people born in the Victorian era, Hurley probably enjoyed a theatrical career acting in provinces or regional theatre and touring before making her first film in 1909. She continued with films until 1926.

She died June 4, 1927 of chronic myocarditis and nephritis.

Filmography

The Grandmother (1909) as Mrs. Julia Hurley (short)
Grandmother (1910) as Mrs Hurley (short)
Grandma (1911) as Mrs. Hurley (short)
The Helping Hand (1912) as Mrs. Hurley (short)
Bedelia's 'At Home'  (1912) (short)
Tempted But True (1912) as Mrs. Hurley (short)
Mother (1912) (short)
Sisters (1912) (short)
The Cuckoo Clock (1912) as Mrs. Hurley (short)
Guy Mannering (1912) as Mrs. Hurley (short)
Two Lives (1913) (short)
Blood and Water (1913)
A Child's Intuition (1913) as Mrs. Hurley (short)
Il trovatore (1914)
The Jungle (1914)
The Price He Paid (1914)
The Reformation of Peter and Paul (1915) (short)
The Melting Pot (1915)
Her Great Match (1915)
The Little Gypsy (1915)
The Ventures of Marguerite (1915) (Serial, Ch. #6)
The Woman Pays (1915)
Gold and the Woman (1916)
The Bondman (1916)
The Unborn (1916) 
Perils of Our Girl Reporters (1916)
The Secret of the Storm Country (1917)
Little Women (1918)
The Beloved Imposter (1918) as Mrs. Hurley
 The Gold Cure (1919)
Beware! (1919)
Mothers of Men (1920)
Easy to Get (1920)
The Cost (1920)
Dr. Jekyll and Mr. Hyde (1920) as Hyde's Old Landlady (uncredited)
Guilty of Love (1920)
A Woman's Man (1920)
The New York Idea (1920)
Enchantment (1921)
Jane Eyre (1921)
Bride's Play (1922)
Argentine Love (1924)
The Little French Girl (1925)
The Making of O'Malley (1925)
Married ? (1926)

References

External links

 as a young actress in 1869 playing Po-Ca-Hon-Tas
Portrait of Julia Hurley (NY Public Library, Billy Rose collection)
Hurley with John Barrymore ; Dr. Jekyll & Mr. Hyde, 1920(TCM);,...zoomed in version

Actresses from New York City
American stage actresses
American silent film actresses
People from Greenwich Village
1848 births
1927 deaths
20th-century American actresses